The Golden Age of Piracy is a common designation for the period between the 1650s and the 1730s, when maritime piracy was a significant factor in the histories of the North Atlantic and Indian Oceans.

Histories of piracy often subdivide the Golden Age of Piracy into three periods:

 The buccaneering period (approximately 1650 to 1680), characterized by Anglo-French seamen based in Jamaica and Tortuga attacking Spanish colonies, and shipping in the Caribbean and eastern Pacific.
 The Pirate Round (1690s), associated with long-distance voyages from the Americas to rob Muslim and East India Company targets in the Indian Ocean and Red Sea.
 The post-Spanish Succession period (1715 to 1726), when Anglo-American sailors and privateers left unemployed by the end of the War of the Spanish Succession turned en masse to piracy in the Caribbean, the Indian Ocean, the North American eastern seaboard, and the West African coast.

Narrower definitions of the Golden Age sometimes exclude the first or second periods, but most include at least some portion of the third. The modern conception of pirates as depicted in popular culture is derived largely, although not always accurately, from the Golden Age of Piracy.

Factors contributing to piracy during the Golden Age included the rise in quantities of valuable cargoes being shipped to Europe over vast ocean areas, reduced European navies in certain regions, the training and experience that many sailors had gained in European navies (particularly the British Royal Navy), and corrupt and ineffective government in European overseas colonies. Colonial powers at the time constantly fought with pirates and engaged in several notable battles and other related events.

Name of the Golden Age

Origin

The oldest known literary mention of a "Golden Age" of piracy is from 1894, when the English journalist George Powell wrote about "What appears to have been the golden age of piracy up to the last decade of the 17th century."  Powell uses the phrase while reviewing Charles Leslie's A New and Exact History of Jamaica, then over 150 years old. Powell uses the phrase only once.

In 1897, a more systematic use of the phrase "Golden Age of Piracy" was introduced by historian John Fiske, who wrote, "At no other time in the world's history has the business of piracy thriven so greatly as in the seventeenth century and the first part of the eighteenth. Its golden age may be said to have extended from about 1650 to about 1720."  Fiske included the activities of the Barbary corsairs and East Asian pirates in this "Golden Age," noting that "as these Mussulman pirates and those of Eastern Asia were as busily at work in the seventeenth century as at any other time, their case does not impair my statement that the age of the buccaneers was the Golden Age of piracy."

Pirate historians of the first half of the 20th century occasionally adopted Fiske's term "Golden Age," without necessarily following his beginning and ending dates for it.  The most expansive definition of an age of piracy was that of Patrick Pringle, who wrote in 1951 that "the most flourishing era in the history of piracy ... began in the reign of Queen Elizabeth I and ended in the second decade of the eighteenth century."  This idea starkly contradicted Fiske, who had hotly denied that such Elizabethan figures as Drake were pirates.

Trend toward narrow definitions

Of recent definitions, that given by Pringle appears to have the widest range, an exception to an overall trend among historians from 1909 until the 1990s, toward narrowing the Golden Age.  As early as 1924, Philip Gosse described piracy as being at its height "from 1680 until 1730." In his highly popular 1978 book The Pirates for TimeLife's The Seafarers series, Douglas Botting defined the Golden Age as lasting "barely 30 years, starting at the close of the 17th Century and ending in the first quarter of the 18th."  Botting's definition was closely followed by Frank Sherry in 1986.  In a 1989 academic article, Professor Marcus Rediker defined the Golden Age as lasting only from 1716 to 1726. Angus Konstam in 1998, reckoned the era as lasting from 1700 until 1730.

Perhaps the ultimate step in restricting the Golden Age was in Konstam's 2005 The History of Pirates, in which he retreated from his own earlier definition, called a 1690–1730 definition of the Golden Age "generous," and concluded that "The worst of these pirate excesses was limited to an eight-year period, from 1714 until 1722, so the true Golden Age cannot even be called a 'golden decade.'"

Recent countertrend toward broader meaning
David Cordingly, in his influential 1994 work Under the Black Flag, defined the "great age of piracy" as lasting from the 1650s to around 1725, very close to Fiske's definition of the Golden Age.

Rediker, in 2004, described the most complex definition of the Golden Age to date.  He proposes a "golden age of piracy, which spanned the period from roughly 1650 to 1730," which he subdivides into three distinct "generations": the buccaneers of 1650–1680, the Indian Ocean pirates of the 1690s, and the pirates of the years 1716–1726.

Martin Mares, drawing on both Cordingly and Rediker, took their arguments about the periodization of the Golden Age of Piracy even further in his seminal work The British Contribution to the Development of Piracy in the Golden Age of Piracy, proposing that the longer periodization can be also understood as an uninterrupted and continuous process with its points of peaks and regressions. Besides, Mares argued that such interpretation allows us to fully understand how the golden age of piracy helped the British to develop the understanding of their imperial policy as one single domain with interconnected interests rather than separate Western and Eastern spheres of influence. This argument was later reinforced from the economical perspective by Nicolás Rodríguez Arosemena. Arosemena, using the analysis of Jamaica's development from the work of Martin Mares, proposes that empirical data collected by Mares has wider implications–most notably – legal ones such as the recognition of ius cogens even before the Industrial Revolution in terms of unfair enrichment, since "it is perfectly possible to have islands of prosperity within a sea of misery. And of course, if we just sample the islands, the world will look like a paradise."

History 

Piracy arose out of, and mirrored on a smaller scale, conflicts over trade and colonization among the rival European powers of the time, including the empires of Britain, Spain, the Netherlands, Portugal, and France. Most pirates in this era were of Welsh, English, Dutch, Irish, and French origin. Many pirates came from poorer urban areas in search of a way to make money and reprieve. London in particular was known for high unemployment, crowding, and poverty which drove people to piracy. Piracy also offered power and quick riches.

Buccaneering period, c. 1650–1710

Historians such as John Fiske mark the beginning of the Golden Age of Piracy at around 1650, when the end of the Wars of Religion allowed European countries to resume the development of their colonial empires. This involved considerable seaborne trade and a general economic improvement: there was money to be madeor stolenand much of it traveled by ship.

French buccaneers had established themselves on northern Hispaniola as early as 1625, but lived at first mostly as hunters of pigs and cattle rather than robbers; their transition to full-time piracy was gradual and motivated in part by Spanish efforts to wipe out both the buccaneers and the prey animals on which they depended. The buccaneers' migration from Hispaniola's mainland to the more defensible offshore island of Tortuga limited their resources and accelerated their piratical raids. According to Alexandre Exquemelin, a buccaneer and historian who remains a major source on this period, the Tortuga buccaneer Pierre Le Grand pioneered the settlers' attacks on galleons making the return voyage to Spain.

The growth of buccaneering on Tortuga was augmented by the English capture of Jamaica from Spain in 1655. The early English governors of Jamaica freely granted letters of marque to Tortuga buccaneers and to their own countrymen, while the growth of Port Royal provided these raiders with a far more profitable and enjoyable place to sell their booty. In the 1660s, the new French governor of Tortuga, Bertrand d'Ogeron, similarly provided privateering commissions both to his own colonists and to English cutthroats from Port Royal. These conditions brought Caribbean buccaneering to its zenith.

Pirate Round, c. 1693–1700

A number of factors caused Anglo-American pirates, some of whom had been introduced to piracy during the buccaneering period, to look beyond the Caribbean for treasure as the 1690s began. The Glorious Revolution had restored the traditional enmity between Britain and France, thus ending the profitable collaboration between English Jamaica and French Tortuga. The devastation of Port Royal by an earthquake in 1692 further reduced the Caribbean's attractions by destroying the pirates' chief market for fenced plunder. Caribbean colonial governors began to discard the traditional policy of "no peace beyond the Line," under which it was understood that war would continue (and thus letters of marque would be granted) in the Caribbean regardless of peace treaties signed in Europe; henceforth, commissions would be granted only in wartime, and their limitations would be strictly enforced. Furthermore, much of the Spanish Main had simply been exhausted; Maracaibo alone had been sacked three times between 1667 and 1678, while Río de la Hacha had been raided five times and Tolú eight.

At the same time, England's less-favored colonies, including Bermuda, New York, and Rhode Island, had become cash-starved by the Navigation Acts.  Merchants and governors eager for coin were willing to overlook and even underwrite pirate voyages; one colonial official defended a pirate because he thought it "very harsh to hang people that brings in gold to these provinces." Although some of these pirates operating out of New England and the Middle Colonies targeted Spain's more remote Pacific coast colonies well into the 1690s and beyond, the Indian Ocean was a richer and more tempting target. India's economic output dwarfed Europe's during this time, especially in high-value luxury goods such as silk and calico, which made ideal pirate booty; at the same time, no powerful navies plied the Indian Ocean, leaving both local shipping and the various East India companies' vessels vulnerable to attack. This set the stage for the famous piracies of Thomas Tew, Henry Every, Robert Culliford, and (although his guilt remains controversial) William Kidd.

Post–Spanish Succession period, c. 1715–1726
In 1713 and 1714, a series of peace treaties ended the War of the Spanish Succession. As a result, thousands of seamen, including European privateers who had operated in the West Indies, were relieved of military duty, at a time when cross-Atlantic colonial shipping trade was beginning to boom. In addition, European sailors who had been pushed by unemployment to work onboard merchantmen (including slave ships) were often enthusiastic to abandon that profession and turn to pirating, giving pirate captains a steady pool of recruits on various coasts across the Atlantic.

In 1715, pirates launched a major raid on Spanish divers trying to recover gold from the sunken treasure galleon Urca de Lima near Florida. The nucleus of the pirate force was a group of English ex-privateers, all of whom were soon be enshrined in infamy: Henry Jennings, Charles Vane, Samuel Bellamy of Whydah Gally fame, Benjamin Hornigold, and Edward England. The attack was successful, but contrary to their expectations, the governor of Jamaica refused to allow Jennings and his cohorts to spend their loot on his island. With Kingston and the declining Port Royal closed to them, Hornigold, Jennings, and their comrades based themselves at Nassau, on the island of New Providence in the Bahamas. Nassau was home for these pirates and their many recruits until the arrival of Governor Woodes Rogers in 1718, which signalled the end of the Republic of Pirates. Rogers and other British governors had the authority to pardon pirates under the King's Act of Grace: while Hornigold accepted this pardon to become a privateer, others such as Blackbeard returned to piracy following their pardon.

Transatlantic shipping traffic between Africa, the Caribbean, and Europe began to soar in the 18th century, a model known as the triangular trade, and became a rich target for piracy. Trade ships sailed from Europe to the African coast, trading manufactured goods and weapons for slaves. The traders then sailed to the Caribbean to sell the slaves, and return to Europe with goods such as sugar, tobacco, and cocoa. In another triangular trade route, ships carried raw materials, preserved cod, and rum to Europe, where a portion of the cargo was sold for manufactured goods, which (along with the remainder of the original load) were then transported to the Caribbean, where they were exchanged for sugar and molasses, which (with some manufactured articles) were then borne to New England. Ships in the Triangular Trade often made money at each stop.

As part of the settlement of the War of the Spanish Succession, the British South Sea Company obtained the asiento, a Spanish government contract to supply slaves to Spain's New World colonies, which provided British traders and smugglers more access to formerly closed Spanish markets in America. This arrangement also contributed heavily to the spread of piracy across the western Atlantic. Shipping to the colonies boomed along with the flood of skilled mariners after the war. Merchant shippers used the surplus of labor to drive wages down, cut corners to maximize profits, and create unsavory conditions aboard their vessels. Merchant sailors suffered from mortality rates as high or higher than the slaves being transported. Living conditions were so poor that many sailors began to prefer a freer existence as pirates. The increased volume of shipping traffic also could sustain a large body of brigands preying upon it.

During this time, many of the pirates had originally been either sailors for the Royal Navy, privateersmen, or merchant seamen. Most pirates had experience living on the sea, and knew how harsh the conditions could be. Sailors for the king often had very little to eat while out on the sea, and ended up sick, starving, and dying. That resulted in some sailors deserting the king and becoming pirates instead. This also allowed for pirates to better fight the navy. Unlike other seamen, pirates had strict rules for how they were to be treated on the ship. Contrary to popular belief, pirate captains did not have a dictatorship over the rest of the pirates on their ship. Captains had to be voted in, and there were strict rules for them to follow as well. The captain was not treated better (with more food, better living conditions, etc.) than the other members of the crew, and was expected to treat the crew with respect. This was in deliberate contrast to merchant captains, who often treated their crews terribly. Many pirates had formerly served on these merchant ships and knew how horrid some captains could be. Because of this, ships often implemented councils composed of all of the crew members on the ship. Some councils were used daily to make ordinary decisions, while others were used as a court system only when criminal incidents or legal matters necessitated it. Whatever the case, crewmembers on pirate vessels often had as much power as the captain outside of battle. The captain only had full authority in times of battle and could be removed from this position if he showed cowardice in the face of the enemy. He was also to be bold in battle. The pirates did not want things to end up the same way as on a navy ship.

Return of the Pirate Round 
Between the years 1719 and 1721, Edward England, John Taylor, Olivier Levasseur, and Christopher Condent operated from Madagascar. Taylor and Levasseur reaped the greatest prize in the history of the Golden Age of Piracy, the plunder of the Portuguese East Indiaman Nossa Senhora Do Cabo at Réunion in 1721, stealing diamonds and other treasures worth a total of £800,000.

Condent was also a successful pirate, but England was not. He was marooned on Comoros by Taylor and Levasseur in 1721, and died not long afterward. Despite the success of Taylor and Levasseur, the Pirate Round quickly declined again. Edward Teach, the notorious "Blackbeard", died in battle in a fight with Lieutenant Robert Maynard's navy ship. He was allegedly stabbed twenty times and shot five times before death.

Pirates of the era 

Many of the best-known pirates in historical lore originate from this Golden Age of Piracy:
 "Black Sam" Bellamy, captain of the Whydah Gally, was lost in a storm off Cape Cod in 1717. Bellamy was popularly known as the "Robin Hood of pirates" and prided himself on his ideological justifications for piracy.
 Stede Bonnet, a rich Barbadian land owner turned pirate solely in search of adventure. Bonnet captained a 10-gun sloop named the Revenge and raided ships off the Virginia coast in 1717. He was caught and hanged in 1718.
 Henry Every, one of the few major pirate captains to retire with his loot without being arrested nor killed in battle. He is famous for capturing the fabulously wealthy Mogul ship Ganj-i-Sawai in 1695.
 Olivier Levasseur, aka La Buse, the only major French pirate in  Nassau who was often associated with Hornigold, Bellamy, Kennedy, and Taylor.
 William Fly, whose execution in 1726 is used by historian Marcus Rediker to mark the end of the Golden Age of Pirates.
 William "Captain" Kidd, executed for piracy at Execution Dock, London, in 1701, is famous for the "buried treasure" he supposedly left behind.
 Edward Low, born in Westminster, was active 1721–1724, was never captured, and was notorious for torturing his victims before killing them; he cut off ears, lips, and noses.
 Henry Morgan, a buccaneer who raided the Spaniards and took Panama City before burning it to the ground. He was to be executed in England, but was instead knighted and made governor of Jamaica. He died a natural death in 1688.
 John "Calico Jack" Rackham, famous for his partnership with female pirates Anne Bonny and Mary Read, was captured, then hanged and gibbeted outside Port Royal, Jamaica, in 1720.
 Bartholomew "Black Bart" Roberts, is considered by many to be the most successful Western pirate of all time with over 400 ship captures. 
 Edward "Blackbeard" Teach (Thatch), active from 1716 to 1718, is perhaps the most notorious pirate among English-speaking nations. Blackbeard's most famous ship was the Queen Anne's Revenge, named in response to the end of Queen Anne's War. He was killed by one of Lieutenant Robert Maynard's crewmen in 1718.
 Charles Vane, a particularly violent and unrepentant pirate, who served under Henry Jennings before striking out on his own. Harsh and unpopular with his crew, Vane was marooned before being captured and hanged in 1721.
Benjamin Hornigold, an English pirate who helped found the Republic of Pirates and mentored Blackbeard before taking a royal pardon and becoming a pirate hunter
 Amaro Pargo, a prominent Spanish corsair who dominated the route between Cádiz and the Caribbean. His figure has been wrapped in a halo of romanticism and legend that have linked him to piracy, hidden treasures, and illicit romances. In the marble headstone of his tomb in San Cristóbal de La Laguna is engraved a skull winking his right eye with two crossbones.

Female pirates 
The best-known female pirates were Anne Bonny, Mary Read, and Rachel Wall.

Anne Bonny (1697–1721) developed a notorious reputation in Nassau. When she was unable to leave an earlier marriage, she eloped with her lover, Calico Jack Rackham.

Mary Read had been dressed as a boy all her life by her mother and had spent time in the British military. She came to the West Indies (Caribbean) after leaving her husband and joined Calico Jack's crew after he attacked a ship she had been aboard. She divulged her gender only to Bonny at first, but revealed herself openly when accused by Rackham of having an affair with Bonny.

The nature of the relationships between Bonny, Read, and Rackham have been speculated to be romantic and/or sexual in various combinations, though there is no definitive proof. In David Cordingly's 2001 book Women Sailors and Sailors’ Women: An Untold Maritime History, Cordingly suggests that Bonny and Read were sexually involved.

When their ship was attacked in 1720, Bonny, Read, and an unknown man were the only ones to defend it; the other crew members were too drunk to fight. In the end they were captured and arrested. After their capture, both women were convicted of piracy and sentenced to death, but they stalled their executions by claiming to be pregnant. Read died in jail months later, many believe of a fever or complications of childbirth. Bonny disappeared from historical documents, and no record of her execution nor a childbirth exist.

Barbary pirates or privateers 

The Barbary pirates were pirates and privateers that operated from the North African (the "Barbary coast") ports of Algiers, Morocco, Salé, Tripoli, and Tunis, preying on shipping in the western Mediterranean Sea from the time of the Crusades as well as on ships on their way to Asia around Africa until the early 19th century. The coastal villages and towns of Italy, Spain and Mediterranean islands were frequently attacked by them, and long stretches of the Italian and Spanish coasts were almost completely abandoned by their inhabitants; since the 17th century, Barbary pirates occasionally entered the Atlantic and struck as far north as Iceland. According to Robert Davis, between 1 million and 1.25 million Europeans were captured by Barbary pirates and sold as slaves in Northern Africa between the 16th and 19th centuries.

Barbary pirates flourished in the early 17th century as new sailing rigs by Simon de Danser enabled North African raiders, for the first time, to brave the Atlantic as well as Mediterranean waters. More than 20,000 captives were said to be imprisoned in Algiers alone. The rich were allowed to redeem themselves, but the poor were condemned to slavery. Their masters on occasion allowed them to secure freedom by professing Islam. Many people of good social position–Germans, Italians, Spaniards, and English travelers in the south–were captives for a time.

In 1627, Iceland was subject to raids known as the Turkish Abductions. Murat Reis is said to have taken 400 prisoners; 242 of the captives were later sold into slavery on the Barbary Coast. The pirates took only young people and those in good physical condition. All those offering resistance were killed, and the old people were gathered into a church, which was set on fire. Among those captured was Ólafur Egilsson, who was ransomed the next year and, upon returning to Iceland, wrote a slave narrative about his experience. Another famous captive from that raid was Guðríður Símonardóttir. The sack of Vestmannaeyjar is known in the history of Iceland as Tyrkjaránið.

While pirates are commonly depicted with eyepatches, this is largely a myth originating in nineteenth century novels and tales of buccaneers that included payment for a lost eye. Few historical pirates wore patches over their eyes, although some, like the 18th century Arab pirate Rahmah ibn Jabir al-Jalahimah, did.

Whilst the Golden Age of European and American pirates is generally considered to have ended between 1710 and 1730, the prosperity of the Barbary pirates continued until the early 19th century. Unlike the European powers, the young United States refused to pay tribute to the Barbary states and responded with the First Barbary War and the Second Barbary War against North Africa, when the Barbary pirates captured and enslaved American sailors.

Buccaneers 
Buccaneers operated mainly in the Caribbean. They originated in Tortuga around the 17th century as hunters, but became "pirates" when government officials paid groups of men to attack and loot Spanish ships. These buccaneers later began attacking any ship worth of value, enemy or not.

Privateers 
Privateers were private persons who engaged in maritime warfare under a commission of war. The commissions were known as "letters of marque", which gave them the authority to raid enemy ships and exemption from piracy charges.Privateers have existed from as far back as the middle ages, where "Letters of reprisal" were issued to ship owners who were wishing to seek revenge for a loss of their own ship

Decline
By the early 18th century, tolerance for privateers was wearing thin in all nations. After the Treaty of Utrecht was signed, the excess of trained sailors without employment was both a blessing and a curse for all pirates. Initially, the surplus of men had caused the number of pirates to multiply significantly. This inevitably led to the pillaging of more ships, which put a greater strain on trade for all European nations. In response, European nations bolstered their own navies to offer greater protection for merchants and to hunt down pirates. The excess of skilled sailors meant there was a large pool that could be recruited into national navies as well.

Piracy was clearly on a strong decline by 1720. The Golden Age of Piracy did not last the decade.

The events of the latter half of 1718 (including the arrival of Governor Woodes Rogers in Nassau) represent a turning point in the history of piracy in the New World. Without a safe base and with growing pressure from naval forces, the rovers lost their momentum. The lure of the Spanish treasures had faded, and the hunters gradually became the hunted. By early 1719, the remaining pirates were on the run. Most of them headed for West Africa, seizing poorly defended slavers.

Effect on popular culture

Stories and histories from the Golden Age form the foundation for many modern depictions of pirates and piracy. A General History of the Pirates (1724) by Captain Charles Johnson is the prime source for the biographies of many well known pirates of the Golden Age, providing an extensive account of the period. In giving an almost mythical status to the more colorful characters such as the notorious English pirates Blackbeard and Calico Jack, it is likely that the author used considerable license in his accounts of pirate conversations. In 2002, English naval historian David Cordingly wrote an introduction to Johnson's 1724 book, stating: "it has been said, and there seems no reason to question this, that Captain Johnson created the modern conception of pirates." Johnson's book influenced the pirate literature of Robert Louis Stevenson and J. M. Barrie. Such literary works as Stevenson's Treasure Island and Barrie's Peter Pan, while romanticized, drew heavily on pirates and piracy for their plots.

Various claims and speculation about their overall image, attire, fashion, dress code, etc. have been made and contributed to their fanciful mystery and lore. For example, men wore earrings as the value of the gold or silver earring was meant to pay for their burial if they were lost at sea and their body washed ashore. They were also worn for superstitious reasons, believing the precious metals had magical healing powers.

More recently, even less accurate depictions of historical-era pirates (e.g., Talk Like a Pirate Day) have advanced to the forefront.  However, these phenomena have only served to advance the romantic image of piracy and its treasure-burying swashbucklers in popular culture.

See also
Governance in 18th-century piracy

References

Bibliography
 Guy Chet, The Ocean is a Wilderness: Atlantic Piracy and the Limits of State Authority, 1688-1856. Amherst, MA: University of Massachusetts Press, 2014.
 Crowhurst, Patrick (1977). The Defence of British Trade, 1689–1815. Dawson.

 Monod, Paul. “Dangerous Merchandise: Smuggling, Jacobitism, and Commercial Culture in Southeast England, 1690–1760.” Journal of British Studies 30.2 (April 1991): 150–82.
Moss, Jeremy (2020). The Life and Tryals of the Gentleman Pirate, Major Stede Bonnet. Koehler Books. .
 Pérotin-Dumon, Anne (2001). “The Pirate and the Emperor: Power and the Law on the Seas, 1450–1850.” In Bandits of the Sea: A Pirate Reader, ed. C. R. Pennell, 25–54. New York University Press.

 Truxes, Thomas (2008). Defying Empire: Trading with the Enemy in Colonial New York. Yale University Press.

External links
 
 
 
 

18th century
17th-century pirates
18th-century pirates
19th-century pirates
Piracy
Piracy in the Caribbean
Historical eras